Max Wehrli (28 April 1930 – 31 May 2014) was a Swiss athlete. He competed in the men's decathlon at the 1952 Summer Olympics.

References

1930 births
2014 deaths
Athletes (track and field) at the 1952 Summer Olympics
Swiss decathletes
Olympic athletes of Switzerland
Place of birth missing